Meddling Women is a 1924 American silent drama film produced by  and distributed by them and/or a State's Rights basis. Directed by Ivan Abramson, the film stars Lionel Barrymore.

Cast

Preservation
A copy of Meddling Women is preserved in the Library of Congress.

See also
Lionel Barrymore filmography

References

External links

 
 

1924 films
1924 drama films
Silent American drama films
American silent feature films
American black-and-white films
Films based on short fiction
Films directed by Ivan Abramson
1920s American films